The Ljubljana Summer Festival is a festival held between July and August in Ljubljana, the capital of Slovenia.

It attracts notable opera stars, ballet and theatre performers and also eminent rock and jazz musicians internationally who perform at the festival.

External links 
 Ljubljana Festival official website

Summer Festival
Festivals in Slovenia
1953 establishments in Slovenia
Summer Festival
Music festivals established in 1953
Summer events in Slovenia